Prakash Thorat (born 11 March 1985) is an Indian professional footballer who played as a forward.

Career

Early career
Born in Pune, Maharashtra, Thorat started his footballing career as a semi-professional, playing for various Maharashtra state clubs like Deccan XI, Maharashtra Police, and Central Railways. He was also twice the top scorer in the Nagpur Premier League in both the 2010 and 2011 seasons in which he scored seven goals in each season. His best moment as a semi-professional came when he played in the inaugural Aurangabad Premier League where he scored an amazing 13 goals in only five matches.

After impressing as a semi-professional Thorat was signed by I-League side Air India for the rest of the 2011–12 season. He made his debut for Air India on 14 April 2012 against Pailan Arrows at the Salt Lake Stadium. He managed to score a brace in that match as Air India won 2–0. Overall, Thorat played in seven matches that season and then in the 2012–13 I-League season he made 20 appearances while scoring only three goals. While with Air India Thorat was played mainly as a winger.

Pune
On 7 June 2013 it was announced that Thorat had signed for hometown club Pune F.C. in the I-League on a two-year deal. He made his debut for the club during the 2013 Durand Cup on 9 September 2013 against Army Red in which he started and played only 24 minutes as Pune lost the match 2–0. He then made his league debut for Pune on 11 December 2013 against Rangdajied United when he came on as an 88th-minute substitute for Thongkhosiem Haokip as Pune lost 3–2.

I-League statistics

References

External links 
 Pune Football Club Profile.
 Instagram Profile.

1985 births
Living people
Footballers from Pune
Indian footballers
Air India FC players
Pune FC players
Association football forwards
I-League players